Germany participated in the Eurovision Song Contest 2019. The German entry was selected through the national final , organised by the German broadcaster Norddeutscher Rundfunk (NDR).

As a member of the "Big Five", Germany automatically qualified to compete in the final of the Eurovision Song Contest. Their entry was the song "Sister" by S!sters, a duo consisting of Laurita Spinelli and Carlotta Truman put together by NDR.

Background 

Germany has won the contest on two occasions: in 1982 with the song "Ein bißchen Frieden" performed by Nicole and in 2010 with the song "Satellite" performed by Lena. Germany, to this point, has been noted for having competed in the contest more than any other country; they have competed in every contest since the first edition in 1956 except for the 1996 contest when the nation was eliminated in a pre-contest elimination round. In 2018, the German entry "You Let Me Walk Alone" performed by Michael Schulte placed fourth of twenty-six competing songs with 340 points.

The German national broadcaster, ARD, broadcasts the event within Germany and delegated the selection of the nation's entry to the regional broadcaster  (NDR). NDR confirmed that Germany would participate in the 2019 Eurovision Song Contest on 19 May 2018. In 2018, the multi-artist national final  determined both the song and performer to compete at Eurovision for Germany. For their 2019 entry, ARD organised a national final with the same procedure.

Before Eurovision

Unser Lied für Israel 
 (English: Our Song for Israel) was the competition that selected Germany's entry for the Eurovision Song Contest 2019. The competition took place on 22 February 2019 at the Studio Berlin Adlershof in Berlin, hosted by Linda Zervakis and Barbara Schöneberger. Seven acts competed during the show with the winner being selected through a combination of votes from a 100-member Eurovision panel, a twenty-member international expert jury panel and public voting. The show was broadcast on Das Erste, One and Deutsche Welle as well as online via ARD's official website daserste.de. The national final was watched by 2.99 million viewers in Germany.

Format
The competition featured seven competing acts performing a song especially written for Eurovision and the winner was selected through a combination of votes from a 100-member Eurovision panel, a 20-member international expert jury panel and public voting. The international jury panel consisted of members who had been national juries for their respective countries at the Eurovision Song Contest, while the Eurovision panel consisted of German television viewers selected in cooperation with Simon-Kucher & Partners and Digame through surveys on social media in order to reflect the taste of the wider European audience.

Competing entries
Interested artists were able to apply for the competition by submitting an application between 19 May 2018 and 31 July 2018. By the end of the process, it was announced that 965 applications were received by NDR and an expert panel narrowed the total number of applicants to 198 artists. Twenty candidates were selected by the twenty-member international jury panel from fifty shortlisted by the 100-member Eurovision panel, who went through a workshop organised by NDR at the Maarwegstudio 2 in Cologne between 28 September and 2 October 2018 where they received vocal coaching and choreography training and the six competing acts were selected through a 50/50 combination of votes from the international jury panel and the Eurovision panel. The six participating acts were announced on 8 November 2018. Between 5 and 9 November 2018, the competing acts worked with twenty-four national and international songwriters, composers and producers in a songwriting camp in order to create new songs or edit existing songs for the national final. 25 songs were created at the songwriting camp and the international jury panel and the Eurovision panel selected six competing entries for the national final. On 8 January 2019, S!sters were announced as the seventh participating act selected by the international and Eurovision panel from additional proposals received by NDR from producers and artists themselves.

Final 
The televised final took place on 22 February 2019. The winner, "Sister" performed by S!sters, was selected through a combination of votes from a 100-member Eurovision panel (1/3), a twenty-member international jury panel (1/3) and public voting (1/3), including options for landline and SMS voting. In addition to the performances of the competing entries, 2010 German Eurovision entrant Lena, who won the Eurovision Song Contest 2010, performed her single "Thank You" and 2018 German Eurovision entrant Michael Schulte performed his single "Back to the Start". German singers Udo Lindenberg and Andreas Bourani performed their single "Radio Song" and German band Revolverheld also performed. 374,313 votes were cast in the final.

Promotion
S!sters made several appearances across Europe to specifically promote "Sister" as the German Eurovision entry. On 6 April, they performed at the Eurovision in Concert at the AFAS Live venue in Amsterdam, hosted by Cornald Maas and Marlayne, to over 4,500 spectators. They also made several radio & television promotions for "Sister" in Germany.

At Eurovision 
The Eurovision Song Contest 2019 took place at Expo Tel Aviv in Tel Aviv, Israel and consisted of two semi-finals on 14 and 16 May and the final on 18 May 2019. According to Eurovision rules, all nations with the exceptions of the host country and the "Big Five" (France, Germany, Italy, Spain and the United Kingdom) are required to qualify from one of two semi-finals in order to compete for the final; the top ten countries from each semi-final progress to the final. As a member of the "Big Five", Germany automatically qualifies to compete in the final. In addition to their participation in the final, Germany is also required to broadcast and vote in one of the two semi-finals.

Final

Germany performed fourth in the final, following the entry from Czech Republic and preceding the entry from Russia. At the end of the show, Germany placed 25th, receiving a total of 24 points: 0 points from the televoting and 24 points from the juries. With the old voting system, Germany would have ranked 24th with 8 points.

Voting
Voting during the three shows involved each country awarding two sets of points from 1-8, 10 and 12: one from their professional jury and the other from televoting. Each nation's jury consisted of five music industry professionals who are citizens of the country they represent, with their names published before the contest to ensure transparency. This jury judged each entry based on: vocal capacity; the stage performance; the song's composition and originality; and the overall impression by the act. In addition, no member of a national jury was permitted to be related in any way to any of the competing acts in such a way that they cannot vote impartially and independently. The individual rankings of each jury member, as well as the nation's televoting results, were released shortly after the grand final.

Points awarded to Germany

Points awarded by Germany

Detailed voting results
The following members comprised the German jury:
 Michael Schulte (jury chairperson)singer, songwriter, represented Germany in the 2018 contest
 Annett Louisansinger, songwriter
 Nico Santossinger, songwriter, composer
 Nicola Rostsinger, songwriter, artist
 Joe Chialomanager, label founder

References

External links
Official ARD Eurovision site

2019
Countries in the Eurovision Song Contest 2019
Eurovision
Eurovision